National Highway 29 (NH 29) is a primary national highway in India. This highway was previously part of old national highways 36, 39 and 150. Due to rationalisation of national highway numbers of India by Gazette notification on 5 March 2010, it was renumbered as National Highway 29. NH-29 runs across the Indian states of Assam, Nagaland and Manipur.

Route 
NH29 connects Dabaka (Sutargaon), Manja in Assam to Dimapur, Chümoukedima, Kohima, Chizami in Nagaland and terminates at Jessami in the State of Manipur.

Junctions  

  Terminal near Dabaka.
  near Manja
  near Dimapur
  near Dimapur
  near Kohima
  Terminal near Jessami.

See also 
 List of National Highways in India
 List of National Highways in India by state

References

External links 

 NH 29 on OpenStreetMap

AH1
National highways in India
National Highways in Assam
National Highways in Nagaland
National Highways in Manipur